Rågsved is a suburb historically belonging to the district of Bandhagen in Stockholm, Sweden.

History
Rågsved remained uninhabited until the mid-1950s. In 1953 a development plan was set up for the area. Rågsveds centrum  and Rågsved metro station  on the Stockholm metro were built in 1955-1957. The first areas built were the neighborhoods of  Snösätrahöjden  and  Bjursätrahöjden The neighbouring community of Hagsätra was formed in 1959.
In the early years, Rågsved was mostly inhabited by expatriate workers from the inner city, particularly from Södermalm, and was considered state of the art in the late 1950s. For a long time it was populated by highly paid, affluent tenants.

While Rågsved was built, an industrialization type of style dominated the construction, and this is visible at the houses located to the north of the subway. There, modernism made its mark, with more towers and slab blocks. Rågsved centrum contains a horseshoe-shaped multi-building which holds different kinds of services  and was designed by architects Kell Åström  (1920-2004) and Lars Bryde (1918-2002).

In the mid-1980s Rågsveds buildings were expanded with Snösätraområdet, where red brick houses with enclosed courtyards were built, much like in  Skarpnäcks gård.

Picture gallery

References

Other Sources
Rågsved website 

Districts of Stockholm